The Bhumibol Dam (formerly known as the Yanhi Dam) is a concrete arch dam on the Ping River, a tributary of the Chao Phraya River, in Sam Ngao District of Tak Province, Thailand. The dam was named after King Bhumibol Adulyadej and it was Thailand's first multi-purpose project.

Background
The dam was originally called Yanhee Dam in 1951 when the government of prime minister Field Marshal Plaek Pibulsongkram initiated the project. It was renamed Bhumibol Dam in 1957.
The dam, among others in the Chao Phraya basin, was constructed beginning in the 1950s to exploit the agricultural and hydroelectric potential of the basin. Construction on the dam began in 1958 and was finished in 1964 at a cost of 3.5 billion baht. The reservoir was completely filled in 1970. The first two generators were commissioned in 1964. In 1972, the Sirikit Dam was completed on the Nan River, one of two major tributaries of the Chao Phraya including the Ping. The Bhumibol and Sirikit Dams control 22 percent of the Chao Phraya's annual runoff combined.

When constructed, the Bhumibol Dam contributed 73.66 percent of Thailand's power generation and in 2003 that number was 2 percent.

During the 2011 Thailand floods, rainfall for March 2011 over the area of northern Thailand was an extraordinary 344 percent above normal.

Design
The dam's catchment area is 
In off-peak hours, the one pump-turbine returns water back into the Bhumibol (upper) reservoir and when demand is high, the pump serves as a generator for power production.

Power station
Six are  Francis-type, one is a  Pelton turbine and one is a  Francis pump-turbine.

The dam's power house underwent upgrades and renovations in the 1990s.

See also

List of power stations in Thailand
 King Bhumibol Adulyadej

References

External links

Bhumibol Dam at Electricity Generating Authority of Thailand
WMO Climate Normals: Bhumibol Dam

Dams in Thailand
Hydroelectric power stations in Thailand
Pumped-storage hydroelectric power stations in Thailand
Arch dams
Dams completed in 1964
Buildings and structures in Tak province
1964 establishments in Thailand
Energy infrastructure completed in 1964